Mohammadabad (also Romanized as Moḩammadābād) is a village in Howmeh Rural District, in the Central District of Garmsar County, Semnan Province, Iran. At the 2006 census, its population was 381, in 107 families.

References 

Populated places in Garmsar County